Achaea catocaloides is a species of moth of the family Erebidae first described by Achille Guenée in 1852. It is found in Liberia, Guinea, Benin, Dahomey, Ivory Coast, Kenya and Uganda.

There are up to two generations per year.

In December 2008 and January 2009, there was a serious outbreak of in the border region of Liberia and Guinea, causing the Liberian government to declare a state of emergency. The feces of the caterpillars made local streams undrinkable.

The larvae normally feed on various trees, but can become a pest on agricultural crops like coffee, cocoa, citrus, plantain, banana and cassava.

The larvae, known as minsangula or lukunku in D.R. Congo and mindelemoka or muchangumuna in Congo Republic, are eaten and frequently sold in markets.

References 

Achaea (moth)
Moths described in 1852
Moths of Africa
Insects of Cameroon
Lepidoptera of West Africa
Insects of Uganda
Insects of Tanzania